The 2021 Trofeo Faip–Perrel was a professional tennis tournament played on hard courts. It was the sixteenth edition of the tournament which was part of the 2021 ATP Challenger Tour. It took place in Bergamo, Italy between 1 and 7 November 2021.

Singles main-draw entrants

Seeds

 1 Rankings were as of 25 October 2021.

Other entrants
The following players received wildcards into the singles main draw:
  Matteo Arnaldi
  Flavio Cobolli
  Luca Nardi

The following player received entry into the singles main draw using a protected ranking:
  Yannick Maden

The following players received entry into the singles main draw as alternates:
  Maxime Janvier
  Sergiy Stakhovsky

The following players received entry from the qualifying draw:
  Nerman Fatić
  Pavel Kotov
  Fábián Marozsán
  Luca Potenza

The following player received entry as a lucky loser:
  Nino Serdarušić

Champions

Singles

 Holger Rune def.  Cem İlkel 7–5, 7–6(8–6).

Doubles

  Zdeněk Kolář /  Jiří Lehečka def.  Lloyd Glasspool /  Harri Heliövaara 6–4, 6–4.

References

2021 ATP Challenger Tour
2021
2021 in Italian tennis
November 2021 sports events in Italy